"Grease" is a song written by Barry Gibb and performed by Frankie Valli (of Four Seasons fame). It is the title song for the 1978 musical motion picture Grease, which was based on the 1971 stage play Grease. Valli released the song, which celebrates the greaser lifestyle, as a single in May 1978; it sold over seven million copies worldwide and appeared twice on the film's soundtrack, first as the opening track and again as the closing track. "Grease" was one of four songs written specifically for the film that had not been in the stage production.

Background
Jim Jacobs and Warren Casey had written a different title track for Grease for its original Chicago production, but the song was discarded when the show was picked up on Broadway. Barry Gibb was commissioned to compose a new title song for Robert Stigwood's film of the stage musical.

Production
The song was recorded separately from, and later than, the rest of those in the film. Shortly after the filming of the 1978 musical Sgt. Pepper's Lonely Hearts Club Band, Gibb invited cast-mate Peter Frampton to play guitar on the Grease session, while also providing backing vocals himself. The other musicians were some of those from the Andy Gibb album that was being made around the same time. Frankie Valli was approached to provide the vocals, due to his vocal range being similar to that of Barry Gibb, his being under the management of Allan Carr at the time, and his status as a popular singer from the pre-British Invasion era that Grease represented. Gibb had a long-standing respect for Valli as "one of the hallmark voices of our generation". Valli accepted, despite suffering from severe otosclerosis and loss of hearing at the time. When Valli recorded "Grease", he did not have a recording contract, having been contracted to Private Stock Records which had folded earlier in 1978. After the single was released on the RSO label, which also issued the soundtrack, Valli quickly landed a deal with Warner Bros., which had Valli's group The Four Seasons under contract at the time.

"Grease" was one of four songs in the film that had not been part of the original musical, and it was the only one not performed by the cast. Valli had been offered the part of the Teen Angel but chose to sing the theme song instead, stating that although that character's song ("Beauty School Dropout") did not chart as a hit, both Valli and Frankie Avalon profited mightily from their respective appearances through album royalties, and thus the choice worked out. The film's director, Randal Kleiser, did not like the added songs because they did not fit the late-1950s/early 1960s style either musically or lyrically, and Kleiser had planned on a different composition by Charles Fox and Paul Williams (Fox having written the theme from Happy Days) before being overruled by the producers. The anachronism was especially true of "Grease", which used disco instrumentation and a contemporary 1970s beat but was, nonetheless, left in.

The film's opening title sequence animation was created by animator John David Wilson's Fine Arts Films studio.

Reception
"Grease" became a number-one single in the United States in 1978 and also reached number forty on the R&B charts in the same year. Later in 1978, Valli released a follow-up album, the title of which—Frankie Valli... Is the Word—echoes the "grease is the word" lyric contained in the chorus of "Grease". "Grease" was Valli's final Top 40 hit.

Record World said that it has "a hot, seventies dance beat that is far from the fifties" and that "Valli sings it well."

The Bee Gees never recorded a studio version of this song; however, they later performed the song in their One Night Only tour from 1997 until 1999 and included a performance with Valli on their live album, One Night Only (September 1998).

Personnel
Frankie Valli — lead vocals
Barry Gibb — backing vocals
The Sweet Inspirations — backing vocals
Peter Frampton — guitar
George Terry — guitar
Harold Cowart — bass
Ron Ziegler — drums
Karl Richardson — engineer
Gary Brown — saxophone

Charts

Weekly charts

Year-end charts

Certifications

Cover versions
 Craig McLachlan covered the song in 1993 and it reached number 44 in the UK.
Girls Aloud covered the song in 2003 as part of Greasemania.

References

Songs about teenagers
Songs about youth subcultures
1978 singles
1978 songs
1993 singles
Billboard Hot 100 number-one singles
Cashbox number-one singles
Craig McLachlan songs
Disco songs
Frankie Valli songs
Funk rock songs
RPM Top Singles number-one singles
RSO Records singles
Warner Records singles
Song recordings produced by Albhy Galuten
Song recordings produced by Barry Gibb
Songs from Grease (film)
Songs from Grease (musical)
Songs written by Barry Gibb
Songs written for films
Film theme songs